Jonathan Atsu (born 27 September 1996) is a French swimmer. He competed in the men's 200 metre freestyle at the 2020 Summer Olympics.

References

External links
 

1996 births
Living people
French male freestyle swimmers
Olympic swimmers of France
Swimmers at the 2020 Summer Olympics
21st-century French people